Susan B. Sorenson is a professor of social policy, and of health and societies, at the University of Pennsylvania. She is also a senior fellow in public health, director of the PhD program in social welfare, and director of the Evelyn Jacobs Ortner Center there. She is known for studying gun violence from a public health and political perspective, and she has argued for increasing the availability of data to researchers regarding this subject.

Education
Sorenson received her B.S. in sociology and psychology from Iowa State University, her M.S. in psychology from the Illinois Institute of Technology, and her Ph.D. in clinical psychology from the University of Cincinnati. Subsequently, she was a post-doctoral scholar in psychiatric epidemiology at the UCLA School of Public Health.

Awards and honors
Sorenson was appointed a fellow of the American Psychological Association's Society for the Psychological Study of Social Issues in 2007. She received the Bridge of Courage Award from Women Organized Against Rape in 2014.

References

External links

 Faculty page

University of Pennsylvania faculty
Living people
Gun violence researchers
American sociologists
American women sociologists
American women epidemiologists
American epidemiologists
Iowa State University alumni
Illinois Institute of Technology alumni
University of Cincinnati alumni
Year of birth missing (living people)
21st-century American women